Temi Mwale is a British social entrepreneur and campaigner, based in London. She founded The 4Front Project in 2012 (formerly called Get Outta The Gang), a youth-led social enterprise "to empower young people and communities to live free from violence".

Mwale grew up on Grahame Park, a housing estate in Colindale in the London Borough of Barnet, North West London where The 4Front Project is located. She is a graduate of law from the London School of Economics.

Mwale's fictional short film The Struggle (2014) premiered at artsdepot in North Finchley, London in January 2014.

Awards
2014: Cosmopolitan Ultimate Women of the Year Awards, UK
2014: Points of Light award, Prime Minister's Office, 10 Downing Street, September 2014 winners
2014: IARS Peacemaker of the Year Award, The IARS International Institute, London
2015: Young Person of the Year (London), Young People of the Year Awards, London
2017: Forbes 30 Under 30 – Europe – Social Entrepreneurs 2017
2018: Young Community Leader of the Year award, Groundwork UK, Birmingham

Filmography
The Struggle (2014) – 10 minutes

See also
Gang
Gangs in the United Kingdom
Social exclusion
Youth exclusion

References

External links

Mwale's film The Struggle at the Fixers site
"Ending youth violence through community healing" – video of Mwale's TEDxHamburg talk in 2017
"We can’t achieve peace without addressing structural violence" – video Mwale's TEDxWarwick talk in 2018
Mwale's writing and video for The Guardian

English women activists
People from the London Borough of Barnet
Alumni of the London School of Economics
Date of birth missing (living people)
Place of birth missing (living people)
Living people
Year of birth missing (living people)